Deng Xiaoping at History's Crossroads is a 2014 TV biopic series based on the life of Deng Xiaoping. It was produced by CCTV.

Awards and nominations

References 

2014 Chinese television series debuts
Cultural depictions of Deng Xiaoping
Dragon Television original programming
Chinese historical television series